Erwin Bolthausen (born 15 October 1945 in Rohr, Aargau) is a Swiss mathematician, specializing in probability theory, statistics, and stochastic models in mathematical physics.

Education and career
Bolthausen received his doctorate in mathematics under Beno Eckmann in 1973 from ETH Zurich. Bolthausen's thesis was entitled Einfache Isomorphietypen in lokalisierten Kategorien und einfache Homotopietypen von Polyeder (Simple isomorphic types in localized categories and simple homotopy types of polyhedra). In 1978 he completed his habilitation at the University of Konstanz and was then an associate professor of mathematics at the Goethe University Frankfurt for the academic year 1978–1979. From 1979 to 1990 he was a full professor at the Technical University of Berlin. Since 1990 he is a full professor at the University of Zurich, where he headed the Institut für Mathematik from 1998 to 2001.

In the early years of his career Bolthausen did research on martingale convergence theorems, combinatorial limit theorems, and the large deviations theory. Later in his career he dealt with stochastic models in mathematical physics, such as wandering in random media, phenomena related to random interfaces (entropic repulsion, wetting phenomena), spin glasses, and polymers in random media.

Bolthausen has been a member of the German National Academy of Sciences Leopoldina since 2007.<ref name-Leopoldina From 1995 to 2000 he was a member of the council of the Mathematisches Forschungsinstitut Oberwolfach. He is since 2002 a member of the scientific advisory board of the École d'Eté de Probabilités de Saint-Flour and since 1994 a member of the Board of Trustees of the Swiss National Science Foundation.

He was an associate editor from 1987 to 1989 for the Annals of Statistics and from 1988 to 1993 for the Annals of Probability. For the journal Probability Theory and Related Fields he was editor-in-chief from 1994 to 2000 and is an associate editor since 2000.

Bolthausen was in 2002 in Beijing an invited speaker with talk  Localization-delocalization phenomena for random interfaces  at the International Congress of Mathematicians and in 1996 in Budapest with talk Large deviations and perturbations of random walks and random surfaces at the European Congress of Mathematicians.

Selected publications

Articles

Books
as editor with Anton Bovier: 
with A. Sznitman:

References

External links
Workshop Probabilistic Techniques in Statistical Mechanics, TU Berlin 2010, in celebration of Erwin Bolthausen's 65th birthday

1945 births
Living people
20th-century Swiss mathematicians
ETH Zurich alumni
University of Konstanz alumni
Academic staff of the Technical University of Berlin
Academic staff of the University of Zurich
Members of the German Academy of Sciences Leopoldina
Probability Theory and Related Fields editors
Probability theorists